Triggerman is a 1948 American Western film written by Howard Bretherton, from a screenplay by Ronald Davidson. The film stars Johnny Mack Brown and Raymond Hatton.

Cast list
Johnny Mack Brown as Johnny Mack Brown
Raymond Hatton as Rusty Steel
Virginia Carroll as Lois Benton
Bill Kennedy as Kirby
Marshall Reed as Moran
Forrest Matthews as Harris
Bob Woodward as Davis
Dee Cooper as Joe

References

1948 films
1948 Western (genre) films
American black-and-white films
American Western (genre) films
Films directed by Howard Bretherton
Monogram Pictures films
1940s American films